Joan of Arc Presents: Guitar Duets is the eighth full-length album by Joan of Arc, released in 2005. The album consists of ten guitar duets, each featuring 2 past members of Joan of Arc, paired up by pulling names out of a hat. On the album cover, the tracks are identified by pictures of the guitarists playing on them.

Track listing
 Bobby Burg & Nate Kinsella - 2:22
 Matt Clark & Bobby Burg - 4:53
 Todd Mattei & Matt Clark - 4:02
 Sam Zurick & Jeremy Boyle - 7:08
 Nate Kinsella & Ben Vida - 3:26
 Tim Kinsella & Mike Kinsella - 2:53
 Jeremy Boyle & Tim Rutili - 10:32
 Todd Mattei & Tim Kinsella - 4:24
 Tim Rutili & Sam Zurick - 7:54
 Mike Kinsella & Ben Vida - 2:52

References

Joan of Arc (band) albums
2005 albums
Instrumental duet albums